The round fifty cent coin was the highest-denomination and largest diameter coin of the Australian decimal coins, introduced in 1966. It has a nominal value of half an Australian dollar, the equivalent of five shillings in pre-decimal currency. Due to the large number minted in 1966, and the rising cost of silver, it was not made in any other year. It was replaced by a twelve-sided 50 cent coin in 1969, which retained its reverse of the Australian Coat of Arms.

The round fifty cent coin contained 80% silver and 20% copper but, because the value of silver quickly increased after the coins were issued, their bullion value became higher than their face value, so they were withdrawn from circulation. A total of 36.45 million coins were minted, with 14 million being put into circulation.

References

External links

 Australian Decimal Currency

Decimal coins of Australia
Fifty-cent coins
Currencies introduced in 1966